Neudorf-Platendorf is a village in the municipality of Sassenburg in Gifhorn district in the German state of Lower Saxony. As of 2020, its population is about 2,800.

Geography

Location 
The village lies east of the River Ise and the state forest of Dragen.
The Aller flows by to the south. To the north and east lies the Großes Moor.

The six kilometre long village street is the longest straight village road in Lower Saxony. One feature of the village are the bridges that link each property to the village street.

Literature 
 Der Landkreis Gifhorn. Die Landkreise in Gifhorn, Bd. 26. Hrsg. von Niedersächsischen Landesverwaltungsamt, Bremen 1972, .

References

External links 
 Website for the municipality of Sassenburg

Gifhorn (district)